Eurema mandarinula, the mandarin grass yellow, is a butterfly in the  family Pieridae. It is found in Democratic Republic of Congo, Rwanda, Burundi, Uganda, Kenya, Tanzania, north-eastern Zambia and Malawi. The habitat consists of semi-montane grassy areas in and around forests.

References

Seitz, A. Die Gross-Schmetterlinge der Erde 13: Die Afrikanischen Tagfalter. Plate 
Seitz, A. Die Gross-Schmetterlinge der Erde 13: Die Afrikanischen Tagfalter. Plate 22e

Butterflies described in 1892
mandarinula
Butterflies of Africa